The Sidney Myer Performing Arts Awards were created in 1984 by the trustees of the Sidney Myer Fund to mark the 50th anniversary of the death of Sidney Myer. The awards were created to commemorate his life and his love for the arts. They intend primarily to enhance the status of performing arts in Australia and recognise outstanding achievements in dance, drama, comedy, music, opera, circus and puppetry.

 there is one Individual Award, one Group Award and one Facilitator's Prize.

The Sidney Myer Performing Arts Awards are announced and presented early each year for the preceding year. The awards are decided on a national basis and each nomination is considered by a judging committee. While past achievement is recognised, consideration is also given to the potential of an individual or group to continue their contribution to Australian society through the performing arts into the future.

Awards

* In 2020 and 2021, as a result of the devastation and isolation wrought by COVID-19, the number of Sidney Myer Performing Arts Awards recipients was expanded to eight. The Awards recognised the essential role of arts and culture in affirming our sense of self and Australia's community spirit as a nation.

Notes

External links

Australian performing arts awards